Ashfield College is a private post-primary school founded in 1977 and located in Dundrum in Dublin, Ireland. The school offers preparation for the Leaving Certificate examination, both as a two-year leaving certificate senior cycle, but also as a one-year (Repeat Leaving Cert.) programme. The school also caters for overseas students wishing to study in Ireland for the Irish leaving certificate. Twenty one leaving certificate subjects are taught at the school, and the school uses e-learning facilities (such as Moodle), and students can access course material, including recorded lectures online. As well as the popular subjects for the leaving cert some less common leaving cert subjects of Arabic, Agricultural Science and Classical Studies are also available at Ashfield. The school offers a career guidance service to students with advice on academic and career issues, such as advice on completing the Irish CAO college application process or the UK UCAS system.

The school also provides tuition programmes at weekends and in the evenings for students sitting the Leaving Certificate and Junior Certificate, also during mid-term, Christmas and Easter school holidays intense revision courses are available. Before start of the school year there is a Pre-Leaving Cert preparation course run, this is a week where students can enroll to improve their ability in a subject or subjects which they will be studying for in the leaving cert. The college also offers grinds in some Junior Certificate subjects, such as English, Irish and Mathematics.

The Christmas Intensive Revision Course for Leaving and Junior Cert. takes place in the first week of January. The Easter Revision exam preparation course take place over the Easter school holidays. Prior to the Leaving Cert exams a final revision course and exam workshop is available usually held in the last week of May.

Ashfield run specific courses for the oral Irish, French and Spanish Leaving Cert exams. These programmes include five hours tuition as well as a mock oral examinations to prepare students for the official exam.

Adult education
Ashfield College also offers a number of adult education course, such as Irish for primary school teaching. Ashfield has also hosted some courses run by the College of Progressive Education.

References

External links
Ashfield College Website
Ashfield College Moodle
Ormonde Education Centre Website (Old Website)

Private schools in the Republic of Ireland
Grind schools in Ireland
Secondary schools in South Dublin (county)
Templeogue